The Workshop of Advanced Academy of Agronomy and Forestry is a historical laboratory at National Taiwan University (NTU) in Da'an District, Taipei, Taiwan.

Name
The house building has been nicknamed Iso House by NTU faculty and students.

History
The building was originally completed on 28 February 1925 during the Japanese rule of Taiwan. It was the workshop for the Advanced Academy of Agronomy and Forestry. The building was designated as a municipal historic site by the Department of Cultural Affairs of the Taipei City Government on 28 July 2009.

Architecture
The building is a wooden Japanese-style bungalow with an area of 397 m2.

Transportation
The building is accessible within walking distance east of Gongguan Station of Taipei Metro.

See also
 List of tourist attractions in Taiwan

References

1925 establishments in Taiwan
Buildings and structures in Taipei
National Taiwan University
Tourist attractions in Taipei